Curimaná District is one of the three districts of the province Padre Abad in Peru.

References

Districts of the Padre Abad Province
Districts of the Ucayali Region